Rowland may refer to:

Places
in the United States
Rowland Heights, California, an unincorporated community in Los Angeles County
Rowland, Kentucky, an unincorporated community
Rowland Township, Michigan
Rowland, Missouri, an unincorporated community
Rowland Township, North Carolina
Rowland, North Carolina, a town
Rowland, Nevada, a ghost town
Rowland, Oregon, a ghost town

Elsewhere
Rowland, Derbyshire, England, a village and civil parish
Rowland (crater), on the Moon

People
Rowland (given name), people so named
Rowland (surname), people so named

Other
The title character of Childe Rowland, a fairy tale by Joseph Jacobs, based on a Scottish ballad
Rowland Institute for Science, now part of Harvard University
Rowland Theater, Pittsburgh, Pennsylvania, United States

See also
Roland (disambiguation)
Rowlands
Rowlan

ja:ローランド (曖昧さ回避)